Mahara is an old town in the Gampaha District in the Western Province in Sri Lanka. It is situated along the A 1 highway.

See also
 Mahara Prison
 List of football clubs in Sri Lanka
 List of Archaeological Protected Monuments in Sri Lanka
Populated places in Gampaha District